Wang Guizhen (born 14 January 1961) is a Chinese alpine skier. She competed at the 1980 Winter Olympics and the 1984 Winter Olympics.

References

External links
 

1961 births
Living people
Chinese female alpine skiers
Olympic alpine skiers of China
Alpine skiers at the 1980 Winter Olympics
Alpine skiers at the 1984 Winter Olympics
Skiers from Jilin
20th-century Chinese women